Publius Porcius Laeca was the name of several Romans in the Republican era, including:

Publius Porcius Laeca (tribune 199 BC)

P. Porcius Laeca was tribune of the plebs in 199 BC, when he prevented Lucius Manlius Acidinus from entering Rome to celebrate an ovation granted by the senate. As tribune, he proposed the Lex Porcia. In 196, he was one of the tresviri epulones. He was assigned as praetor in 195 to Pisa with the task of fighting the Ligurians.

Publius Porcius Laeca (senator 63 BC)

A P. Porcius Laeca was a senator in 63 BC and participated in the Catilinarian conspiracy.

Publius Porcius Laeca (monetalis)

In 110–109 BC, a P. Porcius Laeca was a moneyer (monetalis).

Notes

1st-century BC Romans
2nd-century BC Romans
Ancient Roman politicians
Collective heads of state
People of the Roman Republic
Roman Republican praetors
Numismatics
Ancient Roman prosopographical lists
Porcii